"Party Doll" is a 1957 rock 'n' roll song written by Buddy Knox and Jimmy Bowen. It was performed by Buddy Knox  with the Rhythm Orchids, recorded in April 1956, and it became a hit on the Roulette label.

Background
Buddy Knox was a teenager living near Happy, Texas, in 1948 when he wrote the original verses of "Party Doll" behind a haystack on his family farm. While attending college at West Texas State University, he and two college friends, Jimmy Bowen and Don Lanier, traveled to Clovis, New Mexico, to record the song at the studio of Norman Petty. Knox's sister and two of her friends, Iraene Potts of Amarillo and a neighbor, sang background vocals on the song and a girl from the marching band of Clovis High School was recruited to play cymbal. After pressing copies of the record, a DJ in Amarillo began playing "Party Doll" in 1956 and it soon became a regional hit. After being contacted by Roulette Records in New York City, the song was distributed around the U.S. and became a chart-topping hit, spending a week at No. 1 on the Top 100 chart, the precursor to the Billboard Hot 100, in March 1957. Jerry Allison, drummer for The Crickets (who also recorded for Petty at Clovis), stated in an interview that the drum on Party Doll (which he said was played on a cardboard box) was the inspiration for the drum sound he used for "Not Fade Away".

Cover versions
Almost immediately after Roulette released Knox's version of the song, competing versions of "Party Doll" were recorded and released by other record labels. Wingy Manone and Roy Brown recorded R&B versions of the song which saw some success. 
A less rock and roll version by singer Steve Lawrence (with Dick Jacobs conducting the orchestra) also became a pop hit that year, reaching No. 5 on the Billboard Top 100. Lawrence's version was released on the Coral label. 
The Crests recorded a cover version for their 1960 album, The Crests Sing All Biggies.
The Fleetwoods also recorded a version of the song.  
Ronnie Dove, several years before he became a star, recorded the song in 1961 with his band, the Bell Tones, for Decca Records.
It was also one of several rock'n'roll standards recorded by Lindisfarne on their 1987 party album C'mon Everybody, and released as a single.

In popular culture
 Knox's version of the song was included on the soundtrack to the 1973 film American Graffiti.

References

External links
Buddy Knox 7" vinyl info at discogs.com

Songs about parties
1957 singles
Buddy Knox songs
Steve Lawrence songs
The Fleetwoods songs
Billboard Top 100 number-one singles
Roulette Records singles